The 2020 Internazionali di Tennis Città di Parma was a professional tennis tournament played on indoor hard courts. It was the first edition of the tournament which was part of the 2020 ATP Challenger Tour. It took place in Parma, Italy between 2 and 8 November 2020.

Singles main-draw entrants

Seeds

 1 Rankings are as of 26 October 2020.

Other entrants
The following players received wildcards into the singles main draw:
  Luca Nardi
  Andrea Pellegrino
  Giulio Zeppieri

The following player received entry into the singles main draw using a protected ranking:
  Blaž Kavčič

The following players received entry into the singles main draw as alternates:
  Malek Jaziri
  Peđa Krstin

The following players received entry from the qualifying draw:
  Jack Draper
  Tristan Lamasine
  Stefano Napolitano
  Luca Vanni

The following players received entry as lucky losers:
  Andrea Arnaboldi
  Matteo Gigante
  Evgeny Karlovskiy
  Fabrizio Ornago
  Holger Vitus Nødskov Rune

Champions

Singles

 Cedrik-Marcel Stebe def.  Liam Broady 6–4, 6–4.

Doubles

 Grégoire Barrère /  Albano Olivetti def.  Sadio Doumbia /  Fabien Reboul 6–2, 6–4.

References

Internazionali di Tennis Città di Parma
2020 in Italian tennis
November 2020 sports events in Italy